Kokubu (国分市, Kokubu-shi) was a city located in Kagoshima Prefecture, Japan.

Kokubu may refer to the following:

Places 
, the remains of a castle structure in Kirishima, Kagoshima Prefecture
Kokubu Station (Kagawa), a railway station
Kokubu Station (Kagoshima), a railway station

People
Kokubu (written: 国分 or 國分) is a Japanese surname. Notable people with the surname include:

 (born , 1973), a Japanese impressionist (monomane tarento)
 (1553–1615), a Japanese samurai of the Sengoku through early Edo period
 (born 1976), a Japanese actress and fashion model
 (born 1994), a Japanese football player

See also 
 Kokubun (国分 or 國分), a Japanese surname
 

Japanese-language surnames